A bun is a type of small sweet cake or bread roll.

BUN or Bun may also refer to:

Acronyms
Blood urea nitrogen
BUN test
BUN-to-creatinine ratio

Places
Bún or Boiu village, Albești, Mureș, Romania
Bun, Hautes-Pyrénées, a commune of France
Bun Island, Qikiqtaaluk Region, Nunavut, Canada

Language
Bun language, Yuat language of Papua New Guinea
Bun language (Vanuatu) or Mwotlap language, an Oceanic language
Sherbro language of Sierra Leone, ISO 639 code

Human body
Bun (hairstyle)
Occipital bun, a bulge at the back of the skull
Buns, a slang term for the buttocks

People
Alexandru cel Bun, prince of Moldavia 1400-1432
Bun E. Carlos (born 1951), American drummer
Bun Cook (1904–1988), Canadian ice hockey player
Bun B (born 1973), American rapper
Bun Bun (Yasuaki Fujita), Japanese  composer
Bun Kenny (born 1990), Cambodian–French retired tennis player
Bun Lai, Asian American chef
Bun LaPrairie (1911–1986), ice hockey player
Bun Rany (born 1953), wife of Cambodian Prime Minister
Bun Troy (1888–1918), baseball player
Chou Bun Eng (born 1956), Cambodian politician
Kuoy Bun Reun (born 1967), Cambodian politician
Lam Bun (1930–1967), assassinated Hong Kong radio commentator
Mam Bun Neang, Cambodian politician
Nhek Bun Chhay, Cambodian politician
Poa Bun Sreu, Cambodian politician
Note: Cambodian names put the surname first, so "Bun" is the first given name for the five Cambodians above.

Fictional characters
Bun-bun, in Sluggy Freelance webcomic
Bun (or Tuff), in the anime Kirby: Right Back At Ya!

Other
Bún, rice vermicelli in Vietnamese
Bun Bars, a chocolate candy bar
Bun, short for bunny, slang for rabbit.

See also
Bunn (surname)
Bunne, Dutch town